Rubén Héctor Giustiniani (born November 3, 1955 in Rosario) is an Argentine politician from the Socialist Party (PS), who was National Senator representing Santa Fe Province from 2003 to 2015. An engineer by occupation, he also served as president of the Socialist Party.

Giustiniani was a National Deputy from 1997 to 2003, when he was elected senator for the minority. He was the first Socialist to become a member of the upper house of Congress since Alfredo Palacios (in 1960). In 2007, he was a candidate for the vice-presidency of Argentina, accompanying Elisa Carrió, in the general election held on 28 October 2007, in which he and Carrió gained second place.

References

1955 births
Argentine people of Italian descent
Members of the Argentine Chamber of Deputies elected in Santa Fe
Members of the Argentine Senate for Santa Fe
Living people
People from Rosario, Santa Fe
Socialist Party (Argentina) politicians
Argentine civil engineers